Rembrandt Tower is an office skyscraper in Amsterdam. It has a height of 135 metres, 36 floors and it has a spire which extends its height to 150 metres. It was constructed from 1991 to 1994. The building's foundation required piles 56 metres long and two metres in diameter.

The building was designed by the architects Peter de Clercq Zubli and Tom van der Put from ZZDP Architecten in cooperation with Skidmore, Owings and Merrill from SOM, and was owned initially by William F. McCarter and currently by MBM Corporative Worldwide Inc.

Incident
On 11 March 2002, an armed man stormed the building and took 18 hostages. He claimed the motive was because of his recently bought widescreen TV that he had bought because of the black bars that would be shown while watching widescreen VHS tapes, these bars would still be shown on a widescreen TV, he claimed that this was misleading. He was especially angry at Philips, which used to have its headquarters in the Rembrandt Tower but had relocated a few months before, in July 2001, to the adjacent Breitner Tower. The man shot himself hours later in a toilet.

References

External links 

Official website

Amsterdam-Oost
Office buildings completed in 1994
Rembrandt
Skyscraper office buildings in the Netherlands
Skyscrapers in Amsterdam